Tanya Sabkova (born ) is a Bulgarian female former volleyball player, playing as a right-side hitter. She was part of the Bulgaria women's national volleyball team.

She competed at the 2009 Women's European Volleyball Championship.
She competed at the 2011 Women's European Volleyball Championship.

References

1988 births
Living people
Bulgarian women's volleyball players
Place of birth missing (living people)
Opposite hitters